Xft, the X FreeType interface library, is a free computer program library written by Keith Packard.
 It uses the MIT/X license that The Open Group applied after the post X11R6.4 license restoration.

It is designed to allow the FreeType font rasterizer to be used with the X Rendering Extension; it is generally employed to use FreeType's anti-aliased fonts with the X Window System. Xft also depends on fontconfig for access to the system fonts.

References

External links 

Xft homepage
A tutorial by the author
Fontconfig homepage

Computer libraries
Freedesktop.org
X-based libraries